People who have served as Chairman of Committees of the New South Wales Legislative Assembly are:

References

New South Wales